Flabellifera is a former suborder of isopod crustaceans. It is a polyphyletic or paraphyletic group, and contained over 3000 species. Its members are now placed in the Sphaeromatidea and Cymothoida.

References 

Isopoda
Obsolete arthropod taxa